The priestly mitre or turban ( mitznefet) was the head covering worn by the High Priest of Israel when he served in the Tabernacle and the Temple in Jerusalem.

Etymology
The Hebrew word mitznefet has been translated as "mitre" (KJV) or "headdress". It was most likely a turban, as the word comes from the root "to wrap".

Hebrew Bible
The turban worn by the High Priest was much larger than the head coverings of the priests and was wound so that it formed a broad, flat-topped turban, resembling the blossom of a flower. The head covering of the priests was different, being wound so that it formed a cone-shaped turban, called a migbahat. It was to be made of fine linen, and like all the holy garments, it was to be made by 'gifted artisans ... filled with the spirit of wisdom'. Rashi writes that the High Priests's turban was identical to the turbans of the other priests.

The priestly crown (Hebrew tzitz צִיץ "blossom" "flower") was attached to the turban by means of two sets of blue cords: one going over the top of the head and the other around the sides of the head at the level of the ears (Exodus 39:31).

Talmud
According to the Talmud, the wearing of the turban atoned for the sin of haughtiness on the part of the Children of Israel (B. Zevachim 88b).

References

See also
Ephod
Priestly breastplate
Priestly golden head plate
Priestly robe (Judaism)
Priestly sash
Priestly tunic
Priestly undergarments

Jewish religious clothing
Religious headgear
Turbans
Turban